Blinded wine tasting is wine tasting undertaken in circumstances in which the tasters are kept unaware of the wines' identities. The blind approach is routine for wine professionals (wine tasters, sommeliers and others) who wish to ensure impartiality in the judgment of the quality of wine during wine competitions or in the evaluation of a sommelier for professional certification. More recently wine scientists (physiologists, psychologists, food chemists and others) have used blinded tastings to explore the objective parameters of the human olfactory system as they apply to the ability of wine drinkers (both wine professionals and ordinary consumers) to identify and characterize the extraordinary variety of compounds that contribute to a wine’s aroma. Similarly, economists testing hypotheses relating to the wine market have used the technique in their research. Some blinded trials among wine consumers have indicated that people can find nothing in a wine's aroma or taste to distinguish between ordinary and pricey brands. Academic research on blinded wine tastings have also cast doubt on the ability of professional tasters to judge wines consistently.

Technique
Blind tasting, at a minimum, involves denying taster(s) the ability to see the wine label or wine bottle shape. Informal tastings may simply conceal the bottles in a plain paper bag. More exacting competitions or evaluations utilize more stringent procedures, including safeguards against cheating. For example, the wine may be tasted from a black wine glass to mask the color .

Biases
A taster's judgment can be prejudiced by knowing details of a wine, such as geographic origin, price, reputation, color, or other considerations.

Scientific research has long demonstrated the power of suggestion in perception as well as the strong effects of expectancies. For example, people expect more expensive wine to have more desirable characteristics than less expensive wine. When given wine that they are falsely told is expensive they virtually always report it as tasting better than the very same wine when they are told that it is inexpensive. French researcher Frédéric Brochet "submitted a mid-range Bordeaux in two different bottles, one labeled as a cheap table wine, the other bearing a grand cru etiquette." Tasters described the supposed grand cru as "woody, complex, and round" and the supposed cheap wine as  "short, light, and faulty."

Similarly, people have expectations about wines because of their geographic origin, producer, vintage, color, and many other factors. For example, when Brochet served a white wine he received all the usual descriptions: "fresh, dry, honeyed, lively." Later he served the same wine dyed red and received the usual red terms: "intense, spicy, supple, deep."

Historical results

Professional tasting judges
Perhaps the most famous instance of blind testing of professional wine tasters was the so-called Judgment of Paris, a wine competition held in 1976 wherein the French judges blind-tested wines from France and California. Against all expectations, California wines bested French wines according to the judges, a result which would have been unlikely in a non-blind contest. These results were both highly controversial and influential. The event had a revolutionary impact on expanding the production and prestige of wine in the New World. They also "gave the French a valuable incentive to review traditions that were sometimes more accumulations of habit and expediency, and to reexamine convictions that were little more than myths taken on trust." (The Judgment of Paris was described in the 2005 book Judgment of Paris by George M. Taber and depicted in the 2008 movie Bottle Shock.)

In 1999, Richard E. Quandt and Orley Ashenfelter published a paper in the journal Chance that questioned the statistical interpretation of the results of the 1976 Judgment of Paris. The authors noted that a "side-by-side chart of best-to-worst rankings of 18 wines by a roster of experienced tasters showed about as much consistency as a table of random numbers," and reinterpreted the data, altering the results slightly, using a formula that they argued was more statistically valid (and less conclusive). Quandt’s later paper "On Wine Bullshit" poked fun at the seemingly random strings of adjectives that often accompanied experts' published wine ratings.  More recent work by Robin Goldstein, Hilke Plassmann, Robert Hodgson, and other economists and behavioral scientists has shown high variability and inconsistency both within and between blind tasters; and little correlation has been found between price and preference, even among wine experts, in tasting settings in which labels and prices have been concealed.

Robert Hodgson, a California vintner and retired oceanographer noticed that the results of wine competitions were surprisingly inconsistent. With some expertise in statistics, Hodgson approached the organizers of the California State Fair wine competition in 2005 with a proposal. In the course of their routine duties, he would sometimes present the judges with samples from the same bottle three times without their knowledge. The judges were among the top experts in the American wine industry: winemakers, sommeliers, critics and buyers as well as wine consultants and academics. The results were "disturbing"... "Over the years he has shown again and again that even trained, professional palates are terrible at judging wine." The results were published in the Journal of Wine Economics in 2008 and '09. Hodgson continued to analyze the results of wine competitions across the state and found that the medals awarded for wine excellence "were distributed at random". Although he concedes that "there are individual expert tasters with exceptional abilities", the objective evaluation of large numbers of wines as currently attempted at wine competitions is, he asserts, "beyond human ability".

Non-professionals/consumers

Color bias
In 2001, researchers from the University of Bordeaux asked 54 undergraduate oenology students to test two glasses of wine: one red, one white. The participants described the red as "jammy" and commented on its crushed red fruit.  The participants failed to recognize that both wines were from the same bottle.  The only difference was that one had been colored red with a flavorless dye.

Geographic origin bias
For six years (1999-2005), Texas A&M University invited people to taste wines labeled "France", "California", "Texas", and while nearly all ranked the French as best, in fact, all three were the same Texas wine.  The contest is built on the simple theory that if people don't know what they are drinking, they award points differently than if they do know what they are drinking.

Price bias
Another well-publicized double-blind taste test was conducted in 2011 by Prof. Richard Wiseman of the University of Hertfordshire.  In a wine tasting experiment using 400 participants, Wiseman found that general members of the public were unable to distinguish expensive wines from inexpensive ones.  "People just could not tell the difference between cheap and expensive wine."

Expensive wines are an example of what's known as a Veblen good, a luxury good for which the demand increases as the price increases. Where common goods demand goes up when the price goes down, Veblen goods are common diamonds, mechanical watches, perfume, wines  are more desirable for consumers when the price is higher, hence sales increase. Consumer perceive Veblen goods better quality, exclusive and associate it with status or special occasions.

See also
Judgment of Princeton
2018 Master Sommelier exam cheating scandal, in which all who passed the blind-tasting portion and attained the MS title subsequently lost it when the Court learned one of its members had tipped some candidates off as to some of the wines being tasted.

References

Gustation
Wine tasting
Tasting
Product testing